Nils Langer (born 25 January 1990, in Ludwigsburg) is a German retired tennis player.

Langer reached a career high ATP singles ranking of world  No. 188, achieved in March 2016.

Langer made his ATP main draw debut at the 2009 International German Open in the doubles event where he partnered Kevin Krawietz, but lost in the first round to Marcelo Melo and Filip Polášek, 0–6, 4–6.

At the 2013 MercedesCup he qualified for the tournament, defeating Ivo Klec, Jan Mertl and Evgeny Korolev in the qualifying rounds. In the main draw he drew compatriot Robin Kern, a wildcard entrant, winning 3–6, 6–4, 6–3. His run came to an end where he lost to the second seed and compatriot Philipp Kohlschreiber, 5–7, 2–6.

ATP Challenger Tour finals

Singles: 4 (0–4)

Doubles: 2 (1–1)

Singles performance timeline

External links

 
 

1990 births
Living people
German male tennis players
People from Ludwigsburg
Sportspeople from Stuttgart (region)
Tennis people from Baden-Württemberg